1700 East 56th Street, also known as 1700 Building, is a 38-story luxury apartment building overlooking Lake Michigan and adjacent to Jackson Park and the Museum of Science and Industry in the Hyde Park neighborhood of Chicago in Cook County, Illinois, United States. Designed by Loewenberg Architects, its construction was completed in 1968, followed by a condominium conversion in 1994. With 369 residences, this was the largest Hyde Park condominium conversion in a decade,
when a recession and soaring interest rates halted Chicago's condo conversion frenzy.

This is the tallest building in Chicago south of 13th Street.

The condominium conversion had five different unit designs, each named after a famous Chicago architect:

The Adler, a  studio unit
The Burnham, a 1-bedroom, 1-bath unit
The Mies van der Rohe, a  corner 2-bedroom, 2-bath unit
the Wright, a  corner 3-bedroom, 3-bath unit

Notes

Residential skyscrapers in Chicago
Residential buildings completed in 1968
Residential condominiums in Chicago
1968 establishments in Illinois